Stefan Nikolov Remenkov (Bulgarian: Стефан Николов Ременков) (born 30 April 1923, Silistra - 30 October 1988, Sofia) was a Bulgarian composer and pianist.

Biography 

Remenkov comes from a family of teachers. His father Nikolay Remenkov taught history and philosophy, and was a headteacher. His mother Angelina was a chemistry teacher. He received piano lessons from an early age and began composing already in school. He completed his high school education in Constanta, Romania where the family lived at the time. During World War II he served as a soldier on the front with the Bulgarian army. After the war he studied music graduating in 1950 from the Bulgarian State Conservatoire majoring in composition under Prof. Pancho Vladigerov and Prof. Veselin Stoyanov; and piano under Prof. Dimitar Nenov. He taught Musical Forms at the Bulgarian State Conservatoire from 1950 - 1955 as assistant-lecturer to Prof. Veselin Stoyanov, then specialised for a year at the Moscow Conservatory under Aram Khachaturian.

After that he lived and worked as a composer in Sofia, writing more than 86 compositions. Some of these received awards, for instance "Prelude and Dance" (1957). Most were published and many of Bulgaria's top musicians, orchestras, and choirs performed them. Balkanton released over the years three long playing vinyl records (LP's) with music by Stefan Remenkov, the last one in 1980. Further recordings are in the archives of the Bulgarian National Radio, which broadcast them.
Among his works are one opera, one operetta, a musical, a ballet; many instrumental works - symphonies, concertos for piano and orchestra, for violoncello and orchestra, for violin and orchestra, sonatas for piano, for violin and piano, for flute, oboe, and piano, suites, preludes, divertimento, rhapsody, piano quintet, string quintet, string quartets, trios, film music; as well as solo, choral, and children's songs.

Characteristic for his music is the melodic brightness "rhythmic inventiveness, emotional immediacy and clear formal procedure. His orchestral works are notable for their dynamic vitality and complex combinations of folk rhythms.

Works 

Stage Works
 Opera "Ганем"  (Ganem), 1967
 Operetta "Грешките са наши" (Greshkite sa nashi - The errors are ours), libretto by Radoy Ralin, 1966
 Musical "Принцът и просякът" (The Prince and the Pauper), libretto based on Mark Twain's novel "The Prince and the Pauper", 1973
 Ballet "Непокорените" (Nepokorenite - The Untamed), 1971

Instrumental works
 Symphony in the Classical Style (Симфония в класически стил), 1960
 Sinfonietta, 1960
 Children's Symphony (Детска симфония), 1961
 Symphony No.3, 1965
 Phaeton symphonic poem (Симфонична поема Фаетон), 1966
 Symphony No.4, 1968
 Symphony No.5, 1971
 Suites (1952, 1970)
 Suite "From Distant Lands" (От далечни страни), 1958
 Suite for flute and piano, 1976 
 Divertimento, 1962
 Concerto for piano and orchestra No.1, 1953
 Concerto for piano No.2, 1969
 Concertino for piano and chamber orchestra, 1980
 Concerto for violoncello and orchestra, 1964
 Concerto for violin and orchestra, 1980
 Concert-rhapsody for piano and orchestra, 1981
 Rhapsody for clarinet, 1975
 Ten preludes for piano, 1956 
 Prelude and Dance, 1957
 Three pieces for piano - Panorama (Панорама), Butterfly (Пеперуда), Hay Wagon (Колата със сено), 1966
 Piano quintet
 String quintet
 String quartets (1959, 1960)
 Trio for flute, oboe, and bassoon, op. 54
 Sonata for violin and piano, 1955
 Sonatina for violin and piano, 1972
 Sonatina for piano No. 4, 1984
 Sonata for flute, oboe and piano, 1979
 Watercolour and Humoresque for violin (or viola) and piano, 1950
 Six sonatas for piano (1944, 1948, 1949, 1958, 1959–62, 1980)

Film music
 Димитровградци (Dimitrovgradtsy) (1956)
 Н.Й. Вапцаров (N. J. Vapzarov) (1954), documentary 
 Ропотамо (Ropotamo) (1958), documentary

Vocal
 Hyperion chorus and orchestra 1966, poem Mihai Eminescu
 Solo songs
 Choral songs
 Children's songs (1968)

Awards 

 Orden Cyril and Methodij - Орден Кирил и Методий,   2-ра степен

Bibliography

 Bakers Biographical Dictionary of Musicians, Eight Edition, Schirmer Books, New York 1992
 British Library. Remenkov (Stefan) Соната за цигулка и пиано. Sonate pour violon et piano. (Score and part.) 2 pt. Държавно издателство "Наука и изкуство": София, 1955. g.896.b.(4)
 British Library's Sound Collection. Prelude And Dance/Remenkov Sofia State Philharmonic Orchestra/Vladi Simeonov (recording)
 Frank, Paul; Altman, Wilhelm. Kurzgefasstes Tonkünstler Lexikon, Bd. 2, Ausgabe 15, Wilhelmshaven 1978
 Hollfelder, Peter. Das Grosse Handbuch der Klaviermusik, Hamburg 1996
 The New Grove Dictionary of Music and Musicians, Second Edition, Vol. 21, Macmillan Publishers, London 2001
 Radev, Valcho (Радев, Вълчо). Бележити Силистренци (Belezhiti Silistrenzi - Notable People from Silistra), Silistra 2006
 Schönewolf, Karl. Konzertbuch, Bd. 2, Leipzig 1967

References

External links 
 Union of the Bulgarian composers - Stefan Remenkov
 Stefan Remenkov - Playlist YouTube
 

1923 births
1988 deaths
Bulgarian composers
Bulgarian classical composers
20th-century classical composers
People from Silistra
Burials at Central Sofia Cemetery
Male classical composers
20th-century male musicians